Ahmad Salahuddin (7 July 1937 – 26 November 1996) was a biochemist from India and served as a professor of biochemistry and department chairman (1984-1996) at Aligarh Muslim University (AMU) Aligarh, India. He was selected as a Founder Director of Interdisciplinary Biotechnology Unit at AMU in 1984. He was also noted by a single name as Salahuddin at AMU.

Early life 
Salahuddin was born on 7 July 1937 in town of Jairajpur, District Azamgarh, Uttar Pradesh. His father, Fazlul Bari, was a teacher at the Shibli National College, Azamgarh where he received his early education, and later completed his undergraduate and Master's degrees in 1955 and 1957, respectively, in Chemistry from the Aligarh Muslim University Aligarh, Uttar Pradesh. Initially as a research student, he took interest in Physical Chemistry, joining the laboratory of Professor Wahid U. Malik, Department of Chemistry, AMU and was awarded a Ph.D. degree in Chemistry in 1962.

Career

Chemistry Department, Faculty of Science, AMU, Aligarh
Starting in 1962, he worked as a lecturer in the Department of Chemistry at AMU. Notably, he was selected for the Fulbright Fellowship program from India while working at the university. As a Fulbright fellow, he worked in the laboratory of Charles Tanford, a protein biochemist at Duke University in the United States from 1964 to 1968. He studied the biochemistry of protein folding and focussed in his career on the folding thermodynamics and kinetics, properties of evasive intermediates and the unfolded states.  This was in response to the idea developed by Anfinsen, 4-5 decades ago, about the native structure of the protein that depends on the primary structure i.e. amino acid sequence in linear chain and the pathway to attain the native structure is governed by the same amino acid chain. The formation of the native protein, as a stable, functional, folded in a compact three dimensional globular shape, is agreed to begin by a nucleation process due to interaction firstly between the few neighbourly amino acids as opposed to a search involving interaction between each and every amino acid randomly in the chain, before attaining the native structure. He along with others characterized protein structure experimentally, i.e. measurement of optical rotation, after heat and acid (low pH) treatment. He found that the heat and acid treated model proteins contained residual native ordered structures which were disrupted by treatment with potent denaturant guanidine hydrochloride as shown by steep denaturation curve from the transition of residual native structure to unfolded random coil state for each model protein. He performed equilibrium unfolding studies on ribonuclease protein in guanidine hydrochloride in Tanford's Lab, and the work was found suitable for Ph.D. by Duke University, Durham NC U.S.A in 1968. (Title of his Ph.D. thesis: Thermodynamics of the Denaturation of Ribonuclease by Guanidine Hydrochloride).

Department of Biochemistry, J.N. Medical College, Faculty of Medicine, AMU
In 1968, he returned to AMU and joined the Department of Biochemistry in the Faculty of Medicine as a reader. He taught biochemistry and supervised PhD students, establishing a Protein Research Laboratory in the department.

Establishment of Interdisciplinary Biotechnology Unit (IBU), Faculty of Medicine, AMU, Aligarh 
As a founder director, Salahuddin was present at the foundation ceremony of the new IBU Building on 15 January 1986.  The event was inaugurated by Abdus Salam and other university persons as reported by the Times of India:16 Jan 1986 Newspaper. (ref in progress). He performed a critical role toward the establishment of the Interdisciplinary biotechnology Institute for modern Biological and Biotechnological education at Aligarh along with the AMU administration in 1984, which was a notable achievement in the career of Salahuddin. He was recognized as one of the best persons, in the biological science, associated with AMU community, at the time of his selection as a leader and Founder Director of the institute. As a result the Interdisciplinary Biotechnology Institute is functioning in fulfilling an educational need of the people of Uttar Pradesh, India.

The unfolding of proteins and protein-protein interaction
Salahuddin supervised students on in vitro protein folding thermodynamics and kinetics. The denaturation of egg white ovalbumin, as a model protein, was followed by measuring changes in the properties of UV absorption spectrum and viscosity of protein induced by guanidine hydrochloride. The transition of ovalbumin from native (N) in the absence of denaturant to the denatured protein in random coil structure (D) proceeded in a narrow range of denaturant concentration; 100% (D) existed at high guanidine hydrochloride. The protein unfolding and refolding equilibrium in guanidine hydrochloride was consistent with two state transition, i.e. N—>D, at room temperature. Transition was associated with a negative free energy change in the favour of native structure,N, as opposed to denatured D. The transition in Guanidine hydrochloride was dependent on temperature and native structure was favoured at relatively higher than lower temperatures. The refolding kinetics was consistent with the two state transition. As protein folds these hydrophobic surfaces coalesce and water is exclude, the ordered water molecules become disordered and return to the bulk solvent. The resulting increase in the water molecules' entropy is the thermodynamic driving force i.e. the hydrophobic effect on the stability of native ovalbumin in this study.

The random coil proteins in 6M guanine hydrochloride were characterized by intrinsic viscosity measurements.  The viscosity of ovalbumin in the absence of guanidine hydrochloride was low, 3.55 mL/g. However, viscosity in aqueous solution containing 6 M guanidine hydrochloride (and Beta mercaptoethanol) was 37 mL/g, much higher than the native protein.  The latter observation is similar to a structure of linear polypeptide chain characteristic to the number of amino acid residues and calculated end to end distance as a result of the loss of native structure in ovalbumin. The complete transition of native protein to unfolded protein in aqueous buffer, pH 7, requires high concentration of guanidine hydrochloride, which influences the water structure as a result of interaction between amino acids in the protein and water molecules, from disordered water with high entropy in its absence, to an ordered water with low entropy in 6 M guanidine hydrochloride. This low entropy driven force associated with unfolding of protein by guanidine hydrochloride albeit some energy generated from hydrogen bonding is very weak, as compared to entropy driven protein folding or stabilization by hydrophobic effect in aqueous solution. It is unlikely that ovalbumin in 6 M guanidine contains any directional long range interactions between the amino acids; it possibly behaves as a nascent polypeptide chain in a random coil conformation.

As opposed to ovalbumin, the denaturation of egg white ovomucoid protein did not proceed in a single step but occurred in two steps; the transition at low denaturant was associated with a globular protein structure with less unfolded random coil structure, and at high denaturant concentration protein existed in random coil structure, N—>X–>D. The reversible folding and unfolding at each step follows a two state transition pattern.  As ovomucoid is a domain containing protein, the prediction is that the kinetics of the refolding of D to intermediate stable X will be faster whereas the refolding of X to N may follow a slower kinetic in guanidine hydrochloride. The folding thermodynamic and kinetic studies on domains of Bovine serum albumin showed two state transition in denaturants, whereas the parental bovine serum albumin denaturation proceeded with detection of stable intermediate. These studies are taken to suggest the stable intermediates with native ordered structures may exist on the protein folding pathway. It was not clear earlier that the stable intermediates, elusive in nature, could be studied as the folding of nascent polypeptide chains translated in the presence of interacting factors at ribosomes. The genetics/or biology of factors such as chaperones are thought to help find the mechanism of protein folding in wild type cells; defects in the correct folding of protein(s) in cells are now helpful in linking diseases. 
 
Egg white ovalbumin and anti ovalbumin antibody system was established in his lab, and was used to study the in vitro protein-protein interaction. The main finding was that the hydrophobic effect was the stabilizing force in the antigen and antibody reaction.

Studies on enzymes 
Salahuddin's team also studied enzyme systems under native states and additionally some of the mammalian enzymes were successfully purified in his lab. This included buffalo muscle aldolase, an enzyme involved in glycolytic pathway with substrate preference comparable to an aldolase prepared from a known eukaryotic species, rabbit muscle; Cathepsin purification, substrate specificity and the critical role of sulfhydryl group that was compatible with in vivo function reported for known proteins.

In vitro lectin and carbohydrate interactions; membrane proteins and receptors

Briefly, Salahuddin had a long term goal of studying lectins and cell membrane proteins. Two lectins i.e., a plant based Concanavalin A, and lectins from  mammalian sources i.e. liver were purified in native states and molecular characterization including carbohydrate binding specificity was established in his lab. Cell surface receptor specific to goat immunoglobulin G was characterized in vitro studies in his lab.

Allosteric protein
Salahuddin served as visiting associate professor, University of Maryland School of Medicine, Baltimore, USA from 1975 to 1976: He worked on human hemoglobin which is an allosteric protein. Allosteric effectors usually bind to both deoxy-Hb and carboxyhemoglobin (HbCO), albeit at different sites, leading to a lowered oxygen affinity. The manner in which these effectors impact oxygen binding is unclear and may involve changes in structure. It is noted that Salahuddin and his group suggested conformational changes in HbCO and CO-ligated/3-chain tetramers from the observation of unusually steep oxygen saturation/pH curves obtained for the binding of allosteric effector benzene hexacarboxylate to ligated hemoglobin.

Honours
Honours included: President of Society of Biological Chemists SBC (India) from the period 1989-1990; Member of the Editorial Board of Indian Journal of Biochemistry and Biophysics(1985-1988); Member of Protein Society, Bethesda, USA(1995-1997); Member of the New York Academy of Science, New York(1995-1996); Member of the Executive Committee of the Society of Biological Chemists, India(1974-1975); Member of the Executive committee of Indian Biophysical Society, India (1991-1993); Member of the Guha Research Conference, India (1987-1992); and Member of the Society of Sigma Xi (USA).

See also
(author/or cited)

References

External links
Official website AMU 
Ahmad Salahuddin.https://pubmed.ncbi.nlm.nih.gov/?term=%22Salahuddin+A%22%5BAuthor%5D

Academic staff of Aligarh Muslim University
Scientists from Uttar Pradesh
1937 births
1996 deaths
20th-century Indian biologists
20th-century Indian chemists
People from Azamgarh
Aligarh Muslim University alumni
20th-century Indian Muslims
People from Aligarh
Indian biochemists
Indian scientific authors
Indian immunologists
Indian medical researchers
Duke University alumni